Starfish Hill Wind Farm is a wind power station spread over two hills near Cape Jervis, South Australia. It has 22 wind turbines, eight on Starfish Hill itself and 14 on Salt Creek Hill, with a combined generating capacity of 33 MW of electricity.

Starfish Hill Wind Farm was commissioned in September 2003, making it the first major wind farm in the state. On 30 October 2010, one of the original 23 turbines caught fire and was destroyed. It was not replaced, leaving the wind farm with 22 turbines.

Starfish Hill Wind Farm was developed by Tarong Energy at a cost of $65 million. RATCH-Australia (at that time part of Transfield Services) acquired the wind farm in December 2007.

See also

Wind power in South Australia

References

Fleurieu Peninsula
Wind farms in South Australia
2003 establishments in Australia